Princess Marie of Hesse-Kassel (21 January 1796 – 30 December 1880) was the consort of George, Grand Duke of Mecklenburg-Strelitz.

Early life
Princess Marie of Hesse-Kassel, second daughter of Prince Frederick of Hesse-Kassel, and his wife, Princess Caroline of Nassau-Usingen, was born at Hanau, Hesse-Kassel. Through her father, she was a great-granddaughter of George II of Great Britain. Her father's older brother was the Landgrave of Hesse-Kassel. In 1803, her uncle's title was raised to Elector of Hesse — whereby the entire Kassel branch of the Hesse dynasty gained an upward notch in hierarchy.

Her sister Augusta married Prince Adolphus, Duke of Cambridge, the seventh son of George III of the United Kingdom.

Marriage
On 12 August 1817 in Kassel, Marie married George, Grand Duke of Mecklenburg-Strelitz, son of Charles II, Grand Duke of Mecklenburg. Together they had four children:

Duchess Luise of Mecklenburg-Strelitz (1818–1842).
Frederick William, Grand Duke of Mecklenburg-Strelitz (1819–1904); married Princess Augusta of Cambridge.
Duchess Caroline of Mecklenburg-Strelitz (1821–1876); married then-Crown Prince Frederick, the future Frederick VII of Denmark
Duke Georg August of Mecklenburg-Strelitz (1824–1876); married Grand Duchess Catherine Mikhailovna of Russia.

Ancestry

References

|-

House of Hesse-Kassel
1796 births
1880 deaths
House of Mecklenburg-Strelitz
People from Hanau
Duchesses of Mecklenburg-Strelitz
Grand Duchesses of Mecklenburg-Strelitz